The Faith Tour was the first solo concert tour by English recording artist George Michael, launched in support of his multi-million selling debut solo album Faith. The tour spanned nine months between February and October 1988 with three final shows in the summer of 1989 comprising 109 shows across sixteen countries. It was choreographed by Paula Abdul.

Overview

On 30 October 1987, Michael released his debut solo studio album,  Faith.
After receiving a 1988 Brit Award for "Best British Male" at the Royal Albert Hall in London, George Michael embarked on a massive sold out world tour which would occupy most of that year. It started in Tokyo's Budokan indoor arena in February and ended at Pensacola Civic Center in Pensacola, Florida.
Most of the set list was based on the Faith track listing with a couple of songs from Wham! ("Everything She Wants" and "I'm Your Man"). Michael also paid a tribute to artists that he had been influenced by such as "Lady Marmalade" by Labelle, Wild Cherry's "Play That Funky Music" and Stevie Wonder's "Love's in Need of Love Today". When Michael performed at Birmingham's Genting Arena, Andrew joined him briefly onstage for a performance of  "I'm Your Man".
With already two U.S. number ones, new singles continued to be released while on tour with "One More Try" and "Monkey" also reaching No. 1 in late May and August 1988 on the U.S. Billboard Hot 100.

On Saturday 11 June, Michael performed three songs including Gladys Knight's "If You Were My Woman" for the Nelson Mandela 70th Birthday Tribute at Wembley Stadium. Michael used the concert as preparation for a show later the same day at London's Earls Court.

For the first five months, Michael had consulted eight doctors in a variety of countries for throat pain which had caused some concert cancellations. Eventually in London he was diagnosed with a cyst in the throat. The demanding schedule took a pause for Michael to recuperate.
In August 1988, Michael toured the United States beginning in Landover, Maryland and closing late October in Pensacola, Florida. In August, in Auburn Hills, Michigan, George was joined on stage by Aretha Franklin for a duet on "I Knew You Were Waiting (For Me)". The 43-date American tour alone grossed a total of $15 million (about $ in today's dollars), performing to over 750,000 fans. 
Michael also topped the Billboard Year-End of 1988 charts in the U.S. with his album Faith and single of the same title. According to RIAA, he was the top-selling artist of the year 1988 in the United States.

Last shows (1989)
In early July 1989, nine months after the tour ended, Michael performed three special concerts (shows in Spain had been previously cancelled) at Madrid's Las Ventas, La Rosaleda Stadium, Málaga and Sarrià Stadium in Barcelona.

Broadcast and recordings
The concert on 16 April 1988 in Rotterdam was professionally recorded for a commercial release. No DVD has been released.

The concert on 31 May 1988 in Paris was officially recorded as audio and 11 tracks from that show were broadcast on several radio stations in several countries.

The concert on 1 July 1989 in Madrid was recorded and broadcast live on the television channel TVE1 in Spain and various European and Latin American countries.

Opening acts
Deon Estus (North America, selected dates)
The Bangles (North America, selected dates)
Johnny Clegg & Savuka (Toronto)

Set list
1988

First leg
 "I Want Your Sex"
 "Hard Day"
 "Love's in Need of Love Today"
 "Everything She Wants"
 "Father Figure"
 "I'm Your Man"
 "A Different Corner"
 "Faith"
 "Monkey"
 "Hand to Mouth"
 "One More Try"
 "I Knew You Were Waiting (For Me)"
 "Careless Whisper"
 "I Want Your Sex "
 "Lady Marmalade"

Second leg
 "I Want Your Sex"
 "Hard Day"
 "Everything She Wants"
 "I'm Your Man"
 "A Different Corner"
 "Love's in Need of Love Today"
 "Father Figure"
 "One More Try"
 "Faith"
 "I Knew You Were Waiting (For Me)"
 "Careless Whisper"
 "Lady Marmalade"
 "I Want Your Sex"

Third leg
 "I Want Your Sex (Part I)"
 "Hard Day"
 "Father Figure"
 "I'm Your Man"
 "Love's in Need of Love Today"
 "Everything She Wants"
 "A Different Corner"
 "Faith"
 "Monkey"
 "Hand to Mouth"
 "Play That Funky Music"
 "One More Try"
 "I Knew You Were Waiting (For Me)"
 "Look at Your Hands"
 "Careless Whisper"
 "Lady Marmalade"
 "I Want Your Sex (Part II & III)"

Fourth leg
 "I Want Your Sex"
 "Faith"
 "Hard Day"
 "Everything She Wants"
 "I'm Your Man"
 "A Different Corner"
 "Love's in Need of Love Today"
 "Father Figure"
 "One More Try"
 "I Knew You Were Waiting (For Me)"
 "Lady Marmalade"
 "Careless Whisper"

1989

Shows 

Cancellations and rescheduled shows

Personnel
As printed in the official tour programme.

George Michael – Lead vocals
Chris Cameron – Musical Director
Carlos Rios – Guitarist 
Deon Estus – Bassist
Moyes Lucas – Drummer
Tony Patler – Keyboards 
Andy Hamilton – Saxophone 
Lynn Mabry – Vocalist
Eric Henderson/Art Palmer – Dancers
Lippmann Kahane Entertainment – Management
Jake Duncan – Tour Manager 
Albert Lawrence – Production Manager 
Jonathan Smeeton/Shawn Richardson – Lighting Designers 
Benji Lefevre – Sound Engineer
Chris Porter – Sound Co-ordinator 
Mark Fisher/Jonathan Park – Stageset Designer
Gerry Raymond Barker – Stage Manager 
Ian Tucker – Lighting Crew Chief 
Chris Wade Evans – Monitor Engineer 
Bob Weber – Head Carpenter 
Michael Garabedian – Carpenter 
Dean Hart/Steve Olean – Riggers

Siobhan Bailey – Asst. to George Michael 
Rusty Hooker – Tour Accountant
Triad – Agency 
Nick Sizer – Drum Technician 
Adrian Wilson – Guitar Technician 
Gary Hodgson – Keyboard Technician 
Wells Christie III – Programming Technician 
Ronnie Franklin/Bill Greer – Security Officers 
Melanie Panayiotou – Hair
Kathy Jeung/Melanie Panayiotou – Make Up
Michael Putland/Chris Cuffaro – Tour Photographers 
Alan Keyes – Wardrobe Master
Debra De Luca – Asst. Tour Manager
Paul Corkill – Fitness Trainer
Michael Deissler/Alastair Walsh – Laser Technicians
Brian Latt/John Brant – Color Ray Technicians
Lori Goldklang – Management Assistant 
Deirdre Pratt – Tour Manager Assistant
Showco INC. – Sound 
Samuelsons – Lighting 
VARI*LITE INC. – Moving Lights

References 

George Michael concert tours
1988 concert tours
1989 concert tours